Americhelydia is a clade of turtles that consists of sea turtles, snapping turtles, the Central American river turtle and mud turtles, supported by several lines of molecular work. Prior to these studies some morphological and developmental work have considered sea turtles to be basal members of Cryptodira and kinosternids related to the trionychians in the clade Trionychoidea. Americhelydia and Testudinoidea, both clades within Durocryptodira (hardshell turtles), split a part during the early Creataceous.

References

 
Cryptodira